Lapgiriai Manor was a former residential manor in Lapgiriai village, Jurbarkas District Municipality, Lithuania. It was established in the mid-19th century.

References

Manor houses in Lithuania